The Hydra class of ironclads composed three ships, and . The ships were ordered from France in 1885 during the premiership of Charilaos Trikoupis, as part of a wider reorganization and modernization of the Greek armed forces, which had proved themselves inadequate during the Cretan uprising of 1866. Launched in 1889 and 1890, the ships were ready for service with the Greek Navy by 1892.

The ships frequently served together throughout their careers. Their participation in the Greco–Turkish War in 1897 was limited due to intervention by the Great Powers. Modernizations in the 1890s and 1900s upgraded the ships' armament, but by the First Balkan War, they were too slow to keep up with newer vessels in the Greek fleet, particularly the armored cruiser . They saw action at the Battle of Elli but were left behind due to their slow speed at the Battle of Lemnos. Thoroughly obsolete, the ships were reduced to secondary duties after the war and did not see active duty during World War I. The ships were intended to be sold in 1919, but were retained out of active service until 1929.

Design
The Balkan crisis that started with the Serbo-Bulgarian War, coupled with Ottoman naval expansion in the 1860s and 1870s, prompted the Greek Navy to begin a rearmament program. In addition, the Greek fleet had proved to be too weak to effectively challenge Ottoman naval power during the 1866 Cretan Revolt. In 1885, Greece ordered three new ironclads of the Hydra class. The ships were ordered from the Graville and St. Nazaire shipyards in France during the premiership of Charilaos Trikoupis.

Characteristics

They displaced  as built. Approximately 400 officers and men crewed each ship. Coal storage amounted to  The boilers were trunked into two funnels. The hull was divided into 118 watertight compartments.

The Hydra class was armed with a main battery of three  Canet guns. Two guns were mounted forward in barbettes on either side of the forward superstructure; these were L/34 guns. The third gun, a L/28 gun, was placed in a turret aft. The secondary battery consisted of four  L/36 guns in casemates were mounted below the forward main battery, and a fifth 5.9-inch gun was placed on the centerline on the same deck as the main battery. A number of smaller guns were carried for defense against torpedo boats. These included four  L/22 guns, four 3-pounder guns, four 1-pounder guns, and six 1-pounder Hotchkiss revolver cannons. The ships were also armed with three  torpedo tubes. Two tubes were placed on the broadside and one was mounted in the bow.

The ships were armored with a mix of Creusot and compound steel. Under a full load, however, the belt was completely submerged below the waterline, rendering it largely ineffective. Above the belt, a strake of 3 in of armor covered the side of the vessels amidships.

Service history

Hydra was built by the Ateliers et Chantiers de la Loire dockyard in St. Nazaire, while Spetsai and Psara were built at the Société Nouvelle des Forges et Chantiers de la Méditerranée shipyard in Graville. Hydra was launched on 15 May 1889. Spetsai was launched on 26 October 1889 and Psara followed on 20 February 1890. All three ships were transferred to Piraeus and in service by 1892.

Throughout their careers, the three Hydra-class ships generally operated together. The ships saw limited action in the Greco–Turkish War in 1897, as the Royal Hellenic Navy was unable to make use of its superiority over the Ottoman Navy. The Ottoman Navy had remained in port during the conflict, but a major naval intervention of the Great Powers prevented the Greeks from capitalizing on their superiority. In the immediate aftermath of the war, the three ships were partially rearmed, with work lasting until 1900. Their small-caliber guns were replaced with one  gun forward, eight  guns, four 3-pounders, and ten 1-pounder revolver cannon. One of the 14-inch torpedo tubes was replaced with a  weapon.

In 1908–1910, the ships' armament was again revised. The old 5.9 in guns were replaced with new, longer L/45 models. The three ships saw action during the First Balkan War in 1912 at the Battle of Elli, alongside the powerful armored cruiser . At the subsequent Battle of Lemnos, the ships were left behind due to their slow speed and did not engage the Ottoman flotilla.

By 1914, Hydra and Psara had been reduced to secondary duties: Hydra became a gunnery training ship while Psara was used to train engine-room personnel. During World War I, Greece belatedly entered the war on the side of the Triple Entente and the Hydra-class ships served as coastal defense. They were already obsolete and were decommissioned immediately after the war, although their hulks survived as naval training facilities and accommodation space for a decade. All three ships were broken up for scrap in 1929.

See also 
 List of ironclads

Notes
Footnotes

Citations

References
 
 
 
 
 
 
 
 
 
 

 
Ironclad classes